Mitsue, also spelled Mitsuye in older transcriptions, is a Japanese given name and toponym. Its meaning differs depending on the kanji used to write it.

Kanji
Kanji used to write the name Mitsue include:

Two kanji with readings mitsu and e
: "bright river"
: "bright protection"
: "bright wisdom"
: "bright and flourishing"
: "bright drawing"
Two kanji with readings mi and tsue:
: "heavenly staff"
Three kanji with readings mi, tsu, and e:
: "three, port, branch"

People
, Imperial Japanese Army general during the First Sino-Japanese War and the Russo-Japanese War
Various people on the list of Japanese supercentenarians, including Mitsue Nagasaki (1899–2013) and Mitsue Toyoda (1902–2016)
Mitsuye Yamada (born 1923), Japanese-born American poet and activist
Mitsuye Endo, the plaintiff in the Japanese American internment Supreme Court case of 1944, Ex parte Endo
, Japanese discus and javelin thrower
, Japanese politician with the Liberal Democratic Party
, Japanese manga artist

Places
, Japan
Mitsue, locality in Municipal District of Lesser Slave River No. 124, Alberta, Canada

References

Japanese unisex given names